Langhovde Glacier is a glacier at the east side of the Langhovde Hills, flowing north to Hovde Bay on the east shore of Lützow-Holm Bay, Antarctica. It was mapped from surveys and air photos by the Japanese Antarctic Research Expedition, 1957–62, and named for its proximity to the Langhovde Hills.

See also
 List of glaciers in the Antarctic
 Glaciology

References

 

Glaciers of Queen Maud Land
Prince Harald Coast